Yashoda is the foster-mother of Krishna and the wife of Nanda. She is described in the Puranic texts of Hinduism as the wife of Nanda, the chieftain of Gokulam, and the sister of Rohini. According to the Bhagavata Purana, Krishna was born to Devaki, but Krishna's father, Vasudeva, brought the newborn Krishna to his cousin Nanda, and his wife, Yashoda, in Gokulam. This was for his upbringing, as well as to protect Krishna from Devaki's brother, Kamsa, the tyrannical king of Mathura.

Etymology 

The name Yashoda means 'one who is giver (da) of fame or glory (Yash)'.

Legends

Origin 
According to the Bhagavata Purana, Yashoda was the incarnation of Dhara, the wife of the Vasu, Drona. Little is known about Yashoda's early life, other than her marriage with Nanda. 

Yashoda's Father Sri Sumukha was the treasurer and a wealthy trader of Vraja. He is mentioned to have had a very long beard as fair as the white conchshell, and his skin complexion was as dark as the ripe Indian blackberry. He had an elder sister named Veekshanashobhini (IAST : Vīkṣaṇaśobhini) who was married to a wealthy family of Gomatiksetra (present-day Sultanpur dist., UP). Sumukha also had a younger brother named Charumukha (IAST : Cārumukha) who had a wife named Bālakagopikā of Vrindavana. 
 
Yashoda's Mother Sri Pataladevi (IAST : Pāṭaḷādevī) was from a wealthy and respected mercantile family of seafaring traders from the ancient city of Patala located at the mouth of Indus river in the Sindhu kingdom, which is presently near Thatta, Sindh. Her skin is said to be as soft as the rose petals, known as Pāṭaḷa in Sanskrit. Her family was an ardent devotee of Mother Kali and used to worship her before seafaring. 

Kamsa, the ruler of Mathura, had decided to kill Krishna as soon as he was born. In order to protect Krishna from Kamsa, Krishna and Yoganidra or Yogamaya were born at the same time from the wombs of Devaki and Yashoda, respectively, and were exchanged by Vasudeva Anakadundubhi. Krishna survived as the foster son of Yashoda.

Various childhood episodes or  Lilas of Krishna, growing up in Yashoda's household, abound in northern Indian Hindu religious texts. In the Srimad Bhagavatam, Yashoda is praised as:

Witnessing the Cosmos in Krishna's Mouth 
The Bhagavata Purana describes the following episode:

Liberation of Nalakuvara and Manigriva 
According to the Bhagavata Purana, once, Krishna was playing in the sand and was swallowing it. Yashoda, upon seeing this, was furious with Krishna for disobeying her and punished him by tying him to a mortar, or a grinding stone. The child dragged the mortar to the tree called Marutru, and got himself struck between the twin trees. Immediately, the trees regained their original forms of Nalakuvara and Manigriva, the sons of Kubera. The deities had been cursed by Narada for not paying heed to him, and had been liberated from their curse as trees after meeting Krishna. They paid homage to the child, who blessed them, and the two returned to Vaishravanapuri.

Slaying of Putana 
When the demoness Putana attempts to murder the infant Krishna by breastfeeding him with her poison, Krishna sucks out her life force instead, turning her into a carcass. Hearing the demoness' dying screams, Yashoda finds the corpse still bearing her child in her arms. Yashoda snatches him and waves a cow-tail brush over him, in order to guard him from harm.

Reincarnation of Yashoda 

According to regional tradition, in the Dvapara Yuga, Yashoda could not witness the wedding of Krishna. Krishna promised her that she would get that chance of seeing his wedding when Krishna incarnates again as Venkateshvara in the Kali Yuga. In the Kali Yuga, Yashoda was born as Vakula Devi, as the mother of Venkateshvara and witnessed the nuptials between Venkateshvara and Princess Padmavathi.

See also
 Rohini
 Krishna Janmashtami
 Nanda
 Yadu
 Kamsa

In popular culture
The 1975 Telugu film Yashoda Krishna, directed by C. S. Rao, presented events in the life of Krishna and his attachment towards Yashoda. Sridevi played the role of the child Krishna in the film.

The Tamil devotional song, 'Enna Thavam Seithanai' is addressed to Yashoda, rhetorically wondering what penance she had performed to raise Krishna as her own child. The Carnatic song, "Thaaye Yashoda", composed by Oothukkadu Venkata Kavi, is another song addressed to Yashoda from the perspective of gopikas who complain about Krishna's mischief.

References

External links

 Story of Krishna (Krushn) and Yashoda

People related to Krishna
Women in Hindu mythology
Characters in the Mahabharata
Characters in the Bhagavata Purana